A Season with Verona is the title of a 2002 book by Verona-based British author Tim Parks. It tells the story of a single season following the fortunes of Italian football club Hellas Verona, and deals especially with Parks' relationship with the infamous hard core Brigate Gialloblù who make up Verona's travelling support. All the matches are detailed as well as many off-field dealings. Aside from detailing Hellas Verona's on-the-pitch exploits, Parks provides a commentary of political events in Italy at the time (namely the national election held in 2001 that brought Silvio Berlusconi into power). Parks also describes the way in which the city of Verona is viewed by other parts of the country, with particular emphasis on the reputation of the football club and the city of Verona for xenophobia.

See also
 2000–01 Serie A

References

External links
 Tim Parks Official Website
 Amazon listing

2002 non-fiction books
Association football books